We Are the Dynamite is the debut studio album by Welsh post-hardcore band the Blackout, released on 1 October 2007 by Fierce Panda Records, their final release on the label. The album sold 12,000 copies in its first week of release. The singles released from the album were "The Beijing Cocktail" and "It's High Tide Baby!", with the latter single featuring guest vocals from Ian Watkins of Lostprophets.

Track listing 
 "Tick Tick Boom!!" – 1:26
 "I've Got Better Things to Do Tonight Than Die" – 3:29
 "I Know You Are, But What Am I?" – 3:29
 "Spread Legs, Not Lies" – 3:50
 "The Beijing Cocktail" – 3:43
 "Murder in the Make-Believe Ballroom" – 3:19
 "Prepare for a Wound" – 3:43
 "It's High Tide Baby!" (featuring Ian Watkins) – 3:45
 "Tops Off Party!" – 4:01
 "She Is Macho" – 3:28
 "Life & Death in Space" – 4:21

Personnel
Personnel per booklet.

The Blackout
 Sean Smith – vocals
 Gavin Butler – vocals
 James Davies – guitar
 Matthew Davies – guitar
 Rhys Lewis – bass
 Gareth Lawrence – drums

Additional musicians
 Romesh Dodangoda – string arrangement, drum programming, percussion
 Christiana Mavron – violin
 Rebekah Brown – viola
 Emma Bryden – cello
 Ian Watkins – guest vocals

Production and design
 Romesh Dodangoda – producer, engineer, mixing, mastering
 Chris McFall – art, design, photography

References
Citations

Sources

External links

We Are the Dynamite at YouTube (streamed copy where licensed)

2007 debut albums
The Blackout (band) albums
Fierce Panda Records albums